Yongfengnan station is a station on the Line 16 of the Beijing Subway. This station is opened in December 2016.

Station Layout 
The station has an underground island platform.

Exits 
There are 3 exits, lettered B, C, and D. Exits B and D are accessible.

Transport connections

Rail
Schedule as of December 2016:

References

External links 

Beijing Subway stations in Haidian District
Railway stations in China opened in 2016